Jenni Leigh Dant (born 17 December 1982 in Lincolnshire, Illinois) is a professional women's basketball player.
She was a DePaul University Blue Demons basketball player from January 2002 until April 2005, and was drafted by the Houston Comets of the WNBA. She was released and went on to play in Europe. She is a graduate of Stevenson High School.

DePaul statistics 

Source

References

1982 births
Living people
DePaul Blue Demons women's basketball players
Houston Comets players
People from Lincolnshire, Illinois
American women's basketball players
Basketball players from Illinois